Mohamed Ikoki Msandeki (also spelled Msanduki, born December 31, 1985, in Kondoa) is a Tanzanian marathon runner. He set his personal best time of 2:11:01, at the 2010 Gutenberg Marathon in Mainz, Germany Msandeki represented Tanzania at the 2012 Summer Olympics in London, where he competed for the men's marathon, along with his compatriots Samson Ramadhani and Faustine Mussa. However, he withdrew from the games on the day before the marathon event, because of illness.

References

External links
 
 
 
 
 

1985 births
Living people
Tanzanian male marathon runners
Olympic athletes of Tanzania
Athletes (track and field) at the 2008 Summer Olympics